Daniel Luke Bess (born October 8, 1977) is an American television and film actor.

Bess was born in Honolulu, Hawaii, United States, and attended both high school and a school of the arts while living on the island. He later acted in New York theater before moving to Los Angeles. His mother is a professor and his father (Benjamin "Buddy" Bess) is a publisher, who owns the Honolulu publishing company Bess Press. He also has a brother and a sister.

Bess married fellow actor Linda Park on October 11, 2014.  They have a son together.

Filmography

References

External links

1977 births
Living people
American male film actors
American male television actors
Male actors from Hawaii